Mack Charles Reynolds (February 11, 1935 – September 8, 1991) was an American football quarterback in the National Football League for the Chicago Cardinals and the Washington Redskins.  Reynolds also played in the American Football League for the Buffalo Bills and the Oakland Raiders.  In five seasons, he played 39 games and had 2,932 passing yards.

Reynolds played college football at Louisiana State University.

References

1935 births
1991 deaths
American football quarterbacks
Chicago Cardinals players
Continental Football League coaches
Washington Redskins players
Buffalo Bills players
Oakland Raiders players
LSU Tigers football players
People from Mansfield, Louisiana
Players of American football from Louisiana
American Football League players